"I Wanna Go Too Far" is a song written by Kent Robbins and Layng Martine Jr., and recorded by American country music artist Trisha Yearwood. It was released in July 1995 as the fourth single from the album Thinkin' About You. The song reached number 9 on the US Billboard Hot Country Singles & Tracks chart.

Critical reception
Deborah Evans Price, of Billboard magazine reviewed the song favorably, calling it "a great uptempo ode to rocking the boat and living life to its finest." She goes on to say that Yearwood conveys a "sense of yearning and urgency" and this successfully taps into the emotional core.

Chart performance
"I Wanna Go Too Far" debuted at number 68 on the U.S. Billboard Hot Country Singles & Tracks for the week of August 5, 1995.

References

1995 singles
1994 songs
Trisha Yearwood songs
Songs written by Kent Robbins
Songs written by Layng Martine Jr.
Song recordings produced by Garth Fundis
MCA Records singles